Zolof the Rock & Roll Destroyer is the eponymous debut album by pop rock band Zolof the Rock & Roll Destroyer. It was originally released by Break Even Records / Wonka Vision, but was later re-issued by Law of Inertia / Reignition Records. The songs feature Anthony Green on vocals. Several of the tracks were re-recorded for their follow up album, Jalopy Go Far.

Track listing
 Moment
 Plays Pretty for Baby
 Ode to Madonna
 Words for Now
 Mean Old Coot
 Mr. Song
 Riding Trains in November
 Simon
 There's That One Person You Will Never Get Over No Matter How Long It's Been

References 

2002 debut albums
Zolof the Rock & Roll Destroyer albums